This is a list of notable schools in the African country of Mali.

Universities

See also

 Education in Mali
 Lists of schools

References

Schools
Schools
Mali
Mali
Schools